Anthropology Today is a bimonthly peer-reviewed academic journal published by John Wiley & Sons on behalf of the Royal Anthropological Institute. The journal was established in 1985 and publishes papers that apply anthropological analyses to areas such as education, medicine, and development and link anthropology to other academic disciplines.

References

External links 
 

Wiley-Blackwell academic journals
English-language journals
Publications established in 1985
Bimonthly journals
Anthropology journals